Carex cinerascens is a tussock-forming perennial in the family Cyperaceae, that is native to eastern parts of Asia.

See also
 List of Carex species

References

cinerascens
Plants described in 1902
Taxa named by Georg Kükenthal
Flora of China
Flora of Japan
Flora of Mongolia
Flora of Korea